Çöl Ağaməmmədli (also, Chëlagamamedli, Chël’agamamedli, and Chol’-Aga-Mamedly) is a village and municipality in the Sabirabad Rayon of Azerbaijan.  It has a population of 389.

References 

Populated places in Sabirabad District